Burwell Colbert (December 24, 1783 - 1862), also known as Burrell Colbert, was an enslaved African American at Monticello, the plantation estate of the third President of the United States, Thomas Jefferson. There he served an important role in the day-to-day operation and maintenance of the Jefferson estates, including Poplar Forest, as butler, personal valet, glazier, and painter. He was the son of Betty “Bett” Brown, the second child of Elizabeth “Betty” Hemings, the matriarch of the Hemings family in the United States. He was held in high esteem by President Jefferson as a "faithful servant" who was "absolutely excepted from the whip." When Jefferson died on the night of July 4, 1826, Colbert was counted among those at the bedside of the former president.

According to Edmund Bacon, chief overseer at Monticello for nearly two decades from 1806 to 1822, "Mr. Jefferson had a large number of favorite servants, that were treated just as well as could be. Burwell was the main, principal servant on the place." Jefferson was also said to have had "the most perfect confidence" in his servant Colbert. As such, he was one of two artisans at Monticello who brought particular distinction to themselves in both the operation of the estate and the life of the master of Monticello, Thomas Jefferson. He and his cousin John Hemings were exceptional in that they were given a regular annual allowance of $20 per year, and permitted to go down to the Charlottesville stores and pick out the clothing they wanted. No one else was given this privilege.  This is notable because enslaved African Americans were typically given a predetermined allotment of rudimentary clothing and foodstuffs by their owner, and had no freedom of choice in the matter.

Colbert was ultimately given his freedom in Jefferson's will, and bequeathed the sum of $300.00 for the purchase of tools necessary to continue working in his trade. He had married his first cousin Critta Hemings with whom he became father to eight children. In 1819, Critta died at only thirty-six years of age. Several years later in 1834, Burwell married Elizabeth Battles, a free woman of color with whom he had three daughters.

In freedom, Colbert worked as a glazier and painter at the University of Virginia, of which his former master Jefferson had been the founder in 1819.

Notes
In 1805 President Jefferson wrote in his farm book regarding Burwell Colbert that he “paints and takes care of the house.”

In his will of 1826, Thomas Jefferson wrote of Colbert: “I give to my good, affectionate, and faithful servant Burwell his freedom, and the sum of three hundred Dollars . . .”

In his 1860 memoir, Monticello overseer Edmund Bacon expressed his regard for faithful Burwell saying, "Mr. Jefferson gave him his freedom in his will, and it was right that he did so."

Further reading
 Pierson, Hamilton W., Jefferson at Monticello: The Private Life of Thomas Jefferson From Entirely New Materials. Freeport, NY: Books for Libraries Press, 1862.  Note: This work includes the memoir written by Edmund Bacon himself two years previously entitled Mr. Jefferson’s Servants.
 Gordon-Reed, Annette, Thomas Jefferson and Sally Hemings: an American controversy, W. W. Norton & Company, 2009. , 97803933377612009
 Gordon-Reed, Annette, The Hemingses of Monticello: An American Family, University of Virginia Press, 1997. 
 Rinaldi, Ann, Wolf by the Ears, 1993.

References

External links
PBS Frontline Slave’s Story
PBS Frontline Interview: Lucia Cinder Stanton, Senior Research Historian at the Thomas Jefferson Memorial Foundation
The Monticello Classroom: Burwell Colbert, an enslaved butler

18th-century American slaves
1783 births
1862 deaths
Year of death uncertain
Thomas Jefferson
Jefferson family
Hemings family
People from Monticello
19th-century American slaves